Michael Lynn Cofer (April 7, 1960 – March 21, 2019) was an American football linebacker in the National Football League. He was drafted by the Detroit Lions in the third round of the 1983 NFL Draft. He was a Pro Bowl selection in 1988.

Cofer played college football at Tennessee, where he was a captain of the 1982 squad.

Early life and college career
Cofer was born in Knoxville, Tennessee, and grew up in the city's Mechanicsville neighborhood. He played high school football at Rule High School. Following his senior season, he was named to the Parade All-American team, and was the number one recruit in the state, with offers from 50 schools.

Cofer played college football at Tennessee from 1979 through the 1982 season.  In 1979, he played in all eleven games, registering 27 tackles (11 solo) and a fumble recovery. In 1980, he played in five games, picking up 32 tackles (22 solo), including a sack and two tackles for a loss, as well as two fumble recoveries, before suffering a season-ending knee injury. Cofer played in 10 games in 1981, registering 94 tackles (53 solo) and a blocked punt. He played in 11 games in 1982, tallying 84 tackles (58 solo), including 4 sacks and 5 tackles for a loss, as well as two fumble recoveries. He was named All-SEC following the 1982 season.

At Tennessee, Cofer was known as Mike "Stop" Cofer to distinguish him from his teammate, Mike "Go" Cofer, who played tight end.

Professional career
Cofer was drafted in the 3rd round (67th overall) by the Detroit Lions in the 1983 NFL draft. He played 10 seasons in the NFL, all with the Lions, starting in 104 games. He registered 511 tackles and 63 sacks during his career.

Cofer played in all 16 games during his rookie season, earning 4.5 sacks. During his second season, he moved into the starting lineup, picking up 7 sacks.  Initially a defensive end, he switched to linebacker in 1985 when the Lions' new head coach, Darryl Rogers, installed a 3–4 defense. He registered 7.5 sacks in 1986, and would lead the team in sacks each season from 1987 through 1990. He garnered 12 sacks in 1988 to earn an invitation to the Pro Bowl.

Cofer struggled with injuries during the early 1990s, missing most of the 1991 season and part of the 1992 season. After spending the entire 1993 season on injured reserve, he was waived by the Lions.

Later life and family
Cofer lived near Atlanta with his wife, Reba. They have two sons together, Michael Isaiah and Philip. His younger brother, Joe, also played for Tennessee. Phil Cofer is a member of the Florida State Seminoles men's basketball team.

In September 2013, Cofer was honored as a Vol Legend of the Game during Tennessee's game against South Alabama.

Diagnosed with amyloidosis in 2007, Cofer died in Fayetteville, Georgia on March 21, 2019 at the age of 58.

References

External links
Profile at NFL.com

1960 births
2019 deaths
Players of American football from Knoxville, Tennessee
American football defensive ends
American football linebackers
Tennessee Volunteers football players
Detroit Lions players
National Conference Pro Bowl players
Deaths from amyloidosis